Intercontinental Bank of Lebanon (IBL Bank, Arabic: انتركونتيننتال لبنان) one of the financial banks in Lebanon, established in 1961 as Development Bank SAL (بنك الإنماء).

In September 1998, the majority of the bank's shares were bought by a group of Lebanese and foreign investors.

A year later, in September 1999, the bank acquired the entire shares of BCP Bank Group, and since that date it has operated under the name Intercontinental Bank of Lebanon (IBL).

The bank has 20 branches in Lebanon, in addition to branches in Cyprus , Erbil , Baghdad and Basra.

IBL Bank's head office and main branch are located in Achrafieh, Beirut.

Key people 

 Salim Habib, Chairman and General Manager (formerly a member of parliament)
 Kamal Abi Ghosn, Executive Member of the Board
 Dr. Elie A. Assaf, Independent Member of the Board
 Me. Michel J. Tuéni, Executive Member of the Board

See also 

 List of Banks in Lebanon
 Banque du Liban
 Bank Audi
 Byblos Bank
 Fransabank
 Economy of Lebanon

References 

Banks of Lebanon
1961 establishments in Lebanon
Banks established in 1961